Constituencies in 1801–1832 | 1832 MPs | 1835 MPs | 1837 MPs | 1841 MPs | 1847 MPs | 1852 MPs | 1857 MPs | 1859 MPs | 1865 MPs | Constituencies in 1865–1868

This is a list of parliamentary constituencies which were used for elections to the House of Commons of the Parliament of the United Kingdom from 1832 to 1865.

These constituencies were defined by the Representation of the People Act 1832 (commonly known as the Reform Act 1832), and with the exception of the changes listed below they remained in effect until the next round of revisions in 1867 and 1868, when three pieces of legislation restructured the constituencies:
Representation of the People Act 1867, known as the Reform Act 1867, which redistributed seats in England and Wales
Representation of the People (Scotland) Act 1868, created seven additional Scottish seats to replace seven disenfranchised English boroughs
Representation of the People (Ireland) Act 1868, which did not create or abolish any constituencies, but changed some boundaries

Types of constituency 

There were three types of constituency, each with different arrangements for the franchise:
Counties, which covered the whole of a county. In some cases they were divided into two or more divisions
University constituencies, which had no geographical basis. Their electorate comprised the graduates of the university
Parliamentary boroughs, known in Scotland as burghs, which comprised a town and in some cases some areas outside the town boundaries.
Districts of burghs (in Scotland) and districts of boroughs (in Wales) were a type of borough constituency in which several boroughs jointly elected one Member of Parliament. The areas were not geographically contiguous, and in some cases the boroughs were in different counties

Numbers by type 

This table lists the number of each type of constituency in use in 1832, in the four constituent countries of the United Kingdom:

Changes

List of constituencies

See also 
List of constituencies enfranchised and disfranchised by the Reform Act 1832

References

Sources 

1832-1868
Parliamentary constituencies
Parliamentary constituencies
Parliamentary constituencies
Parliamentary constituencies